Wiązownica Mała  is a village in the administrative district of Gmina Staszów, within Staszów County, Świętokrzyskie Voivodeship, in south-central Poland.

The village has a population of  205.

Demography 
According to the 2002 Poland census, there were 208 people residing in Wiązownica Mała village, of whom 46.2% were male and 53.8% were female. In the village, the population was spread out, with 22.6% under the age of 18, 31.3% from 18 to 44, 20.2% from 45 to 64, and 26% who were 65 years of age or older.
 Figure 1. Population pyramid of village in 2002 — by age group and sex

References

Villages in Staszów County